Asbjørn Reidar Jordahl (born 12 December 1932) is a Norwegian journalist and a politician for the Labour Party. Jordahl worked for the newspaper Tidens Krav in Kristiansund from 1959 to 1967. He represented Møre og Romsdal in the Norwegian Parliament 1977–81, and served as Minister of Transport and Communications 1978–1979. In 1981 he became editor-in-chief of Tidens Krav.

References

1932 births
Living people
Government ministers of Norway
Ministers of Transport and Communications of Norway
20th-century Norwegian politicians